St. Bride's is a town on the Cape Shore of Newfoundland, Canada.  Located 166 km Southwest of the capital of Newfoundland and Labrador, St. John's, St. Bride's is a fishing community with a population of approximately 318 persons as of 2021. The largest codfish ever caught, weighing in at 125 lbs, was landed here in 1905.

St. Bride's is the largest community on the Cape Shore, and serves as an administrative centre. It is home to Fatima Academy and several businesses and government services.

The community is named for the Irish St. Brigid, which reflects the community's strong ties to the southeast of Ireland, and the influence of the Catholic Church.

It was the location of St. Bride's Radar Station.

Demographics 

References

Saint Bride's, Newfoundland and Labrador
Populated places in Newfoundland and Labrador